The College of Arts, Sciences, and Engineering is one of the primary units of the University of Rochester, encompassing the majority of the undergraduate and graduate enrollment. The College is divided in the units of Arts and Sciences and the Hajim School of Engineering and Applied Sciences. The College is located on the River Campus of the University of Rochester, though some departments maintain facilities on other campuses. The College was established in 1955 upon the merger of the separate colleges for men and women at the university.

Undergraduate academics

Undergraduate education at the College has no required subjects or core curriculum common to all students. The only class that resembles a requirement is WRT 105 or Reasoning and Writing in the College, which serves as the primary writing requirement, though it is not required with certain test scores. It is also not a single class, but rather a set of courses with different subjects to allow for diversity of interest.

All undergraduates are required to pursue study in three areas of knowledge: humanities, social sciences and natural sciences. Aside from a concentration, which falls into one of the areas of study, undergraduate students must complete at least one "cluster" of related courses (usually 3-4 courses) within each of the remaining areas. For example, a student with a concentration in mathematics, a natural science field, must complete at least one cluster in the humanities and one in social sciences. A second concentration or a minor also satisfies this requirement. The only exceptions are students concentrating in an accredited engineering field (biomedical engineering, chemical engineering, electrical and computer engineering or mechanical engineering), who are only required to have one cluster in either humanities or social sciences.

Tuition and financial aid
2013-14 River Campus undergraduate tuition is estimated at $45,372. Total charges (including room and board, fees, books, and personal expenses) is approximately $61,340. More than $40 million is given in financial aid (does not include federal and state grants and loans). Most Rochester undergraduates receive some form of financial assistance, including academic merit scholarships. More than 95 percent of Ph.D. students receive financial aid, usually enough to cover tuition and living expenses.

Departments and concentrations
Students may take courses from any of the many departments within the College. Each department may offer concentrations, minors, clusters or other degree programs. There are also many interdepartmental programs and students have the option of creating their own courses of study with a special application. The College also offers graduate programs of study in addition to undergraduate.

Departments in Arts and Sciences

Departments in the Hajim School of Engineering and Applied Sciences
Audio and Music Engineering
Biomedical Engineering
Chemical Engineering
Computer Science (Moved from Arts and Sciences in Fall 09)
Electrical and Computer Engineering
Mechanical Engineering
The Institute of Optics

References

External links
The College - Arts, Sciences, Engineering
The College Dean of Students Office

 
Engineering schools and colleges in the United States
Educational institutions established in 1955
1955 establishments in New York (state)
Liberal arts colleges at universities in the United States